Gynocentrism is a dominant or exclusive focus on women in theory or practice. Anything can be gynocentric when it is considered exclusively with a female point of view in mind.

Etymology
The term gynocentrism is derived from ancient Greek, γυνή and κέντρον. Γυνή can be translated as woman or female, but also as wife.<ref name="Kraus">{{cite book|last=Kraus|first=Ludwig A.|title=Kritisch-etymologisches medicinisches Lexikon (Dritte Auflage)|publisher=Deuerlich & Dieterich|year=1844|location=Göttingen, Germany|oclc=491993305}}</ref> In ancient Greek compounds with γυνή, the stem γυναικ- is normally used. This stem can be spotted in the genitive case γυναικός, and in the older form of the nominative case γύναιξ. In ancient Greek, no compounds are known to exist with γυνή that start with γυνο- or γυνω-.

The ancient Greek word κέντρον can be translated as sharp point, sting (of bees and wasps), point of a spear  and stationary point of a pair of compasses, with the meaning centre of a circle related to the latter. The meaning centre/middle point (of a circle) is preserved in the Latin word centrum, a loanword from ancient Greek. The English word centre is derived from the Latin centrum. The word κέντρον is derived from the verb κεντεῖν, meaning to sting (of bees), to prick, to goad, and to spur. When trying to explain etymologically the term gynocentrism, it is important to consider the ancient Greek κέντρον, with the signification middle point/centre, and not the more obvious ancient Greek word κεντρισμός (mirroring -centrism).

History
The term gynocentrism has been in use since at least 1897 when it appeared in The Open Court stating that Continental Europeans view Americans "as suffering rather from gynocentrism than anthropocentrism." In 1914, author George A. Birmingham found American social life to be "gynocentric"; it was "arranged with a view to the convenience and delight of women."

Beginning with second-wave feminism in the 1970s, the term gynocentrism has been used to describe difference feminism, which displayed a shift towards understanding and accepting gender differences, in contrast to equality feminism.

In contemporary society
The Men Going Their Own Way (MGTOW) community, noted for their anti-feminism and misogyny, describes themselves as a backlash against the "misandry of gynocentrism". According to University of Massachusetts philosopher Christa Hodapp, in modern men's movements gynocentrism is described as a continuation of the courtly love conventions of medieval times, wherein women were valued as a quasi-aristocratic class, and males were seen as a lower serving class. This viewpoint describes feminism as the perpetuation of oppressive medieval conventions such as devotional chivalry and romanticized relationships, rather than as a movement towards liberation.

In a 2019 study of Trinidad society published in the Justice Policy Journal, researchers concluded that "gynocentrism pervades all aspects of the criminal justice system as well as society."Joseph-Edwards, A., & Wallace, W. C. (2020). Suffering in Silence, Shame, Seclusion, and Invisibility: Men as Victims of Female Perpetrated Domestic Violence in Trinidad and Tobago. Journal of Family Issues, 0192513X20957047.

Criticism

Some post-modern feminists such as Nancy Fraser question the assumption of a stable concept of 'woman' which underlies all gynocentrism. Christina Hoff Sommers has argued that gynocentrism is anti-intellectual and holds an antagonistic view of traditional scientific and creative disciplines, dismissing many important discoveries and artistic works as masculine. Sommers also writes that the presumption of objectivity ascribed to many gynocentrist theories has stifled feminist discourse and interpretation. Feminist writer Lynda Burns emphasises that gynocentrism calls for a celebration of women's positive differences—of women's history, myths, arts and music—as opposed to an assimilationist model privileging similarity to men. However observed in practice, the preeminence of women associated with gynocentric narratives is often seen as absolute: interpersonally, culturally, historically, politically, or in broader social contexts such as popular entertainment. As such, it can shade into what Rosalind Coward called "womanism... a sort of popularized version of feminism which acclaims everything women do and disparages men".

In the 2006 book Legalizing Misandry'' religious studies professors Paul Nathanson and Katherine K. Young claim that feminist calls for equality or equity are a subterfuge for gynocentrism. Nathanson and Young state that ideologically, the overriding focus of gynocentrism is to prioritize women hierarchically, and as a result may be interpreted as misandry (hatred of and prejudice towards men). They claim that gynocentrism as a worldview has become de rigueur in law courts and government bureaucracies, resulting in systemic discrimination against men. They define gynocentrism as a form of essentialism as it focuses on the innate virtues of women and the innate vices of men.

See also

 Androcentrism
 Gynocriticism
 Princess sickness

References

External links
 Peter Wright, 'Gynocentrism As A Narcissistic Pathology'
 Iris M. Young, 'Humanism, Gynocentrism and Feminist Politics'
 Gynocentrism and its Cultural Origins
 Gynocentric Eco-Logics
 International Academy HAGIA: Matriarchy

Feminist criticism
Matriarchy
Feminism